Castelu is a commune in Constanța County, Northern Dobruja, Romania.

The commune includes two villages:
 Castelu (historical name:  Chiostel)
 Nisipari (historical name: Caratai)

Castelu is located in the central part of the county, along the Danube–Black Sea Canal.

Demographics
At the 2011 census, Castelu had 3,453 Romanians (77.08%), 340 Roma  (7.59%), 509 Turks (11.36%), 165 Tatars (3.68%), 6 Aromanians (0.13%), 7 others (0.16%).

Gallery

References

Communes in Constanța County
Localities in Northern Dobruja